Carrs or Carr's may refer to:
 Carr (landform), north European wetland, a fen overgrown with trees
 The Carrs, an area in Durham, England
 Carr's Landing, also named Carrs, a community in British Columbia, Canada
 Carr's, English manufacturers of water biscuits
 Carrs Quality Centers, former name of Carrs-Safeway, a food retail chain

See also
 Carr (disambiguation)